Lifemapper is building a species diversity map of the world.  It is similar to the SETI@Home client, in that it uses a volunteer computing client running primarily on home user's computers to correlate georeferenced biological samples with environmental models of the Earth.  It is an experimental GIS, or Geographic Information System, that uses a special genetic algorithm to see if predicted rules about where a species lives match up with the species' observed natural settings.  It is hoped that this technique will be able to both represent a current "map" of all organisms habitats on Earth as well as predict where organisms may possibly thrive or face extinction due to climate change and other ecological transformations.

See also
 List of volunteer computing projects
 Environmental niche modelling

External links
 Lifemapper website

Volunteer computing projects